Lars Sigurd Björkström (born 19 November 1943) is a Swedish-born Brazilian sailor and Olympic Champion. He competed at the 1980 Summer Olympics in Moscow and won a gold medal with Alexandre Welter in the Tornado class.

References

External links
 
 
 

1943 births
Living people
Brazilian male sailors (sport)
Olympic sailors of Brazil
Olympic gold medalists for Brazil
Olympic medalists in sailing
Sailors at the 1980 Summer Olympics – Tornado
Medalists at the 1980 Summer Olympics
Brazilian people of Swedish descent
Swedish emigrants to Brazil